The Fairbanks North Star Borough is a borough located in the state of Alaska. As of the 2020 census, the population was 95,665, down from 97,581 in 2010. The borough seat is Fairbanks. The borough's land area is slightly smaller than that of the state of New Jersey.

Fairbanks North Star Borough comprises the Fairbanks, AK, Metropolitan Statistical Area, which is one of only two metropolitan areas in Alaska.

The borough is home to the University of Alaska Fairbanks, Fort Wainwright and Eielson Air Force Base.

Geography

Adjacent boroughs and census areas
 Yukon-Koyukuk Census Area, Alaska – north
 Southeast Fairbanks Census Area, Alaska – southeast
 Denali Borough, Alaska – southwest

Government and politics

The assembly is the borough's governing body, or legislative branch.  The assembly consists of nine members who are elected at-large (borough-wide), serving three-year terms.  The borough operates under a "strong mayor" system.  The mayor, along with his chief of staff, performs many of the job duties normally associated with a city manager.

Mayor
 Bryce Ward (term ends October 2024)

Assembly members
October 2018 – October 2019; the year term expires is in parenthesis next to name

 Seat A – Marna Sanford (2021)
 Seat B – Frank Tomaszewski (2022)
 Seat C – Mindy O'Neall (2022)
 Seat D – Christopher Quist (2020)
 Seat E – Jimi Cash (2020)
 Seat F – Liz Lyke (2021)
 Seat G – Leah Berman Williams (2021)
 Seat H – Aaron Lojewski (2020)
 Seat I – Matt Cooper (2022)

The borough operates a public library system; the main library is the Noel Wien Public Library.

Demographics

As of the census of 2000, 82,840 people, 29,777 households, and 20,516 families were residing in the borough.  The population density was 11 people per square mile (4/km2). There were 33,291 housing units at an average density of 4 per square mile (2/km2). The racial makeup of the borough was 77.79% White, 5.6% Black or African American, 6.90% Native American, 2.08% Asian, 0.30% Pacific Islander, 1.71% from other races, and 5.39% from two or more races.  4.15% of the population were Hispanic or Latino of any race.

Of the 29,777 households, 41.30% had children under the age of 18 living with them, 54.70% were married couples living together, 9.30% had a female householder with no husband present, and 31.10% were non-families. 23.60% of households were one person, and 3.60% were one person aged 65 or older.  The average household size was 2.68 and the average family size was 3.20.

In the borough the population was spread out, with 30.10% under the age of 18, 12.20% from 18 to 24, 33.30% from 25 to 44, 19.80% from 45 to 64, and 4.60% 65 or older.  The median age was 30 years. For every 100 females, there were 109.10 males.  For every 100 females age 18 and over, there were 110.90 males.

Communities

Cities
Fairbanks
Fort Wainwright
North Pole

Census-designated places

Badger
Chena Ridge
College
Eielson AFB
Ester
Farmers Loop
Fox
Goldstream
Harding-Birch Lakes
Moose Creek
Pleasant Valley
Salcha
South Van Horn
Steele Creek
Two Rivers

Other unincorporated communities
Chatanika
Chena Hot Springs

Education
The entire borough is zoned to Fairbanks North Star Borough School District.

Sister cities
 Pune, India
 Yakutsk, Russia

See also

List of airports in Fairbanks North Star Borough
National Register of Historic Places listings in Fairbanks North Star Borough, Alaska

References

External links
 Fairbanks North Star Borough official website
 Borough map, 2010 census: Alaska Department of Labor

 
1964 establishments in Alaska
Populated places established in 1964